The Montreal Locomotive Works RS-10 was a  diesel locomotive built for the Canadian market. It was essentially an ALCO RS-3 in a redesigned carbody. It retained the RS-3's 12-cylinder Alco 244 engine. MLW built 129 of these locomotives before the model was replaced by the MLW RS-18.

Original owners

See also 
 List of MLW diesel locomotives

B-B locomotives
RS-10
Railway locomotives introduced in 1954
Standard gauge locomotives of Canada